The Body Talk Tour is a concert tour by Swedish singer-songwriter Robyn. The tour was announced in conjunction with the release of her sixth studio album, Body Talk Pt. 2. Previously, Robyn toured the United States in the summer of 2010 with the All Hearts Tour. The tour began on October 7, 2010.

Critical reception
Chris Riemenschneider (The Star Tribune) proclaimed the singer's performance in Minneapolis was original and well-executed stating, "Fans probably would have danced right through the floors of the downtown Minneapolis club if they hadn't also been so busy singing along to each of the dance-pop star's jilted, down-but-not-out love songs." Nicola Meighan (The Herald) gave Robyn's performance at the O2 ABC Glasgow 4 out of 5 stars saying, "[…]and her voice is as intimate as it is strong: lines like, "hey little star, don’t be afraid", spotlight Robyn's faculty for intergalactic yet private charm."

Kerri Mason (Billboard) praised her performance in Miami. She wrote, "On stage, she is enigmatic, an appealing sprite with a voice that coos and chirps, but with a fighter's stance and narrow eyes. Whether the song was about sexy cyborgs ('Fembot'), fearless love ('Indestructible', the next 'Body Talk' single), or the pain of rejection ('Be Mine!'), she sang each word with conviction, punctuating each beat with her own dance – a punchy hip-hop/raver style of movement usually reserved for after-hours dance floors, fearless and anonymous at the same time." Jaime Murnane (Chicago Sun-Times) called her performance in Chicago "highly energetic". She also mentions, "Robyn gives a whole new meaning to a live performance. Her signature energetic dance moves aside, the show was made even more special by various remixes of her own songs, like a circus-y sounding 'Cobrastyle' from her 2005 self-titled album that introduced fans to her new electro style -- a far cry from the pop/R&B hits like 'Show Me Love' that earned her worldwide success a decade earlier."

Opening acts
Maluca Mala (North America—Leg 1)
Natalia Kills (North America—Leg 1 & Leg 2) (select dates)
BFGF (North America—Leg 1) (select dates)
Diamond Rings (North America—Leg 2)
 Le Corps Mince de Françoise (Hamburg)

Setlist

Tour dates

Festivals and other miscellaneous performances

This concert is a part of the WHBQ 107.5 Jingle Jam
This concert is a part of the Fly 92.3 Jingle Jam
This concert is a part of the K104 Not So Silent Night
This concert is a part of Telekom Street-Gigs
This concert is a part of the White Party
This concert is a part of Coachella Valley Music and Arts Festival
This concert is a part of the Sasquatch! Music Festival

This concert is a part of the Bonnaroo Music Festival
This concert is a part of the Glastonbury Festival
This concert is a part of the Hove Festival
This concert is a part of Rock Werchter
This concert is a part of Ruisrock
This concert is a part of the Way Out West Festival
This concert is a part of Bestival
|

Cancellations and rescheduled shows

Box office score data

References

Robyn concert tours
2010 concert tours
2011 concert tours